The 2016 SWAC men's basketball tournament is the postseason men's basketball tournament for the Southwestern Athletic Conference. The tournament will be held from March 8–12, 2016 at the Toyota Center in Houston, Texas  The champion will receive the conference's automatic bid to the 2016 NCAA tournament.

Seeds
All 10 SWAC teams participated in the Tournament. Alcorn State was ineligible for NCAA postseason play due to APR violations. Had Alcorn State won the tournament, the SWAC's bid would have been awarded to the highest remaining seed still in the field. The top 6 teams received a bye into the Quarterfinals. 

Teams were seeded by record within the conference, with a tiebreaker system to seed teams with identical conference records.

Schedule

*Game times in Central Time. #Rankings denote tournament seeding.

Bracket

References

SWAC men's basketball tournament
2015–16 Southwestern Athletic Conference men's basketball season